Radio Rampur is a community radio in Rampur, Palpa District, Lumbini Zone, Nepal. It is founded by locals of Rampur Municipality. Sukadev Pokharel was the station manager at that moment. Bashudev Devkota is the founder chairman of this radio station. It is also a broadcasting partner of ACORAB and Ujyaalo 90 Network. Bashu Dhakal is the chief news editor. Sita Dotel is a news reader as well as a programmer.

References

Mass media companies of Nepal
2006 establishments in Nepal